Ferguson is an unincorporated community in Phillips County, Arkansas, United States. At 6:30 PM on April 26, 2011, a tornado – part of the 2011 Super Outbreak – hit Ferguson and traveled along Arkansas Highway 44 toward Coahoma, Mississippi. The tornado knocked down trees, power lines, telephone poles, road signs, and irrigation facilities.

References

Unincorporated communities in Phillips County, Arkansas
Unincorporated communities in Arkansas